Scams is a 2019 Japanese-language TV series starring Yosuke Sugino and Tomoya Maeno.

Cast 
 Yosuke Sugino as Seijitsu Kusano
 Tomoya Maeno as Soichi Seimiya
 Maika Yamamoto as Misaki Azuma
 Junki Tozuka as Shotaro Tanaka
 Shōdai Fukuyama as Tatsuya Kurusu
 Ron Mizuma as Yohei Mori
 Takuya Wakabayashi as Taku Goriki
 Asuka Hanamura as Hana Tsujihime
 Shuntarō Yanagi as Onuma
 Takashi Yamanaka as Ryo Yamada
 Masato Wada as Kaoru Dokukawa
 Naomi Nishida as Sachiko Kusano
 Tetta Sugimoto as Tojo
 Ryohei Otani as Kobe Itsu

Release 
Scams was released on June 30, 2019 on MBS.

References

External links
 
 

Japanese-language television shows
Japanese drama television series
2019 Japanese television series debuts
Japanese-language Netflix original programming